Nikolay Alekseevich Kuznetsov (April 25, 1931 – August 30, 1995) was an Azerbaijani water polo player who competed for the Soviet Union in the 1964 Summer Olympics.

In 1964 he was a member of the Soviet team which won the bronze medal in the Olympic water polo tournament. He played all six matches and scored one goal.

See also
 List of Olympic medalists in water polo (men)

External links
 

1931 births
1995 deaths
Azerbaijani male water polo players
Russian male water polo players
Soviet male water polo players
Olympic water polo players of the Soviet Union
Water polo players at the 1964 Summer Olympics
Olympic bronze medalists for the Soviet Union
Olympic medalists in water polo
Medalists at the 1964 Summer Olympics